Emmanuel Bilodeau (born August 29, 1964) is a Canadian actor from Quebec. He is most noted for his performances in the 2000 film Soft Shell Man (Un crabe dans la tête), for which he won the Jutra Award for Best Supporting Actor at the 4th Jutra Awards in 2002, and the 2006 television miniseries René Lévesque, for which he won the Gémeaux Award for Best Lead Actor in a Drama Series in 2007.

He was also a Jutra nominee for Best Supporting Actor at the 7th Jutra Awards in 2005 for Love and Magnets (Les Aimants) and at the 10th Jutra Awards in 2008 for Bluff, and a nominee for Best Actor at the 13th Jutra Awards in 2011 for Curling.

In addition to his film and television performances, he has also toured two one-man comedy stage shows, One Manu Show in 2014 and Manu Bilodeux dans le pétrin in 2021.

Personal life
He is married to actress . In 2021 they starred in the television documentary series , which centred on their process of expanding the gardens at their home to move toward an agricultural lifestyle to become more self-sufficient and reduce their ecological footprint.

He was previously married to actress Monique Spaziani. Their daughter Philomène is an actress, who appeared alongside her father in Curling and starred in the television series Toute la vie.

Filmography

Film

Television

References

External links

1964 births
21st-century Canadian male actors
21st-century Canadian comedians
Canadian male film actors
Canadian male television actors
Canadian male stage actors
Canadian male comedians
Canadian stand-up comedians
Comedians from Quebec
Male actors from Quebec
People from Gatineau
French Quebecers
Living people
Best Supporting Actor Jutra and Iris Award winners